12/4 may refer to:
December 4 (month-day date notation)
April 12 (day-month date notation)
12 shillings and 4 pence in UK predecimal currency

See also
 4/12 (disambiguation)